Camaegeria polytelis is a moth of the family Sesiidae first described by Daniel Bartsch and Jutta Berg in 2012. It is known from eastern Madagascar.

The holotype and most paratypes were provided from the region of Moramanga and Andasibe. Most of them were caught in disturbed primary forests.

References

External links

Sesiidae
Moths described in 2012
Moths of Madagascar
Moths of Africa